Ikurangi is one of the four major peaks of Rarotonga in the Cook Islands. It has an elevation of 485 metres above sea level and overlooks the capital Avarua and the village of Matavera. The peak is climbable by a hiking trail. Its name is derived from a mountain in Tahiti and in turn is remembered by Mount Hikurangi in New Zealand.

See also
 Geography of the Cook Islands

References

Rarotonga
Ikurangi
Mountains of Oceania